This is a list of Vascular plant species occurring in Tsimanampetesotsa National Park, Madagascar.

List of vascular plants
This list of vascular plants found in Tsimanampetsotsa National Park is based primarily on Ratovonaman with the addition of species noted in LaFleur, mentioned in Tropicos or verified observations on INaturalist. Species names were checked for currency and endemisim using the Tropicos Catalogue of the Plants of Madagascar. The name used in the primary reference is given in brackets if different from the current name given in Tropicos. Endemic species are marked with an asterisk *.

References

Tsimanampetsotsa